In organic chemistry sulfamation is the installation of either of two related functional groups, sulfamic acid (R2NSO3H) and sulfamate (R2NSO3−).  Typical methods entail reaction of primary amines with sources of sulfur trioxide such as pyridine-sulfur trioxide:
RNH2  +  SO3  →  RNHSO3H

Sulfamation can also be effected by treating the amine with the sulfate ester of catechol (C6H4O2SO2).

References

Sulfur oxoacids
Sulfamates